"Back from Cali" is the second single and fourth track from Slash's self-titled solo album. It is one of the two songs on the album to feature Alter Bridge frontman Myles Kennedy on lead vocals, the other being "Starlight." The song was written and recorded in March 2010 added to the album's track listing at the last minute since Slash was so impressed with Kennedy's performance on "Starlight." He later asked Kennedy to front his solo touring band. Both "Back from Cali" and "Starlight" have since become regular features in Slash's live shows.

The music video debuted in March 2010.

Personnel
Slash – guitars
Myles Kennedy – lead vocals
Chris Chaney – bass guitar
Josh Freese – drums
Lenny Castro - percussion

Music video
The music video debuted in March 2010. It features the touring band on tour. The video is a compilation of live shows of the band playing "Back from Cali". It includes shows of the first time they played "Back from Cali" on Lopez Tonight, clips of a gig from MTV Classic Launch, and the gig from Rock am Ring 2010, among others. It also includes a few backstage clips of the band and places around California.

References

External links
Slash's Myspace
Slash's official site
Slash on Saynow

Songs written by Slash (musician)
Songs written by Myles Kennedy
Slash (musician) songs
Universal Records singles
Roadrunner Records singles
EMI Records singles
Song recordings produced by Eric Valentine
2010 singles
2010 songs